Nicholas Mario Torrão de Almeida (born 18 November 1987 in Johannesburg, South Africa), simply known as Niki Torrão, is a South African-born Macanese professional football striker who plays for Liga de Elite club Sporting de Macau. He also plays for the Macau national football team.

International career
In 2011, Torrão scored the winning goal for Macau in the 67th Interport Cup against Hong Kong's under-21 team.

On 11 October 2017, Torrão equalised for Macau against India at Sree Kanteerava Stadium eight minutes before half-time in a 2019 AFC Asian Cup qualification third round match. It was Macau's first ever goal in the final round of the qualifiers.

Goals for senior national team
Scores and results list Macau's goal tally first.

References

External links
 Niki Torrão at playmakerstats.com (formerly thefinalball.com)

1987 births
Living people
Sportspeople from Johannesburg
Macau people
Macau footballers
Macau international footballers
South African soccer players
Macau people of Portuguese descent
South African people of Portuguese descent
Association football forwards
S.L. Benfica de Macau players
Liga de Elite players